Will is a surname found in the English-speaking world. 

People with this surname include:
 Clifford Martin Will (born 1946), Canadian-born mathematical physicist
 Conrad Will (politician) (1779–1835), American physician, politician, and pioneer
 Conrad Will (triathlete) (1941–2002), American early pioneer in the sport of triathlon
 George Will (born 1941), American conservative writer

See also
Will (disambiguation)

Surnames from given names